Port Waikato is on the south bank of the Waikato River at its outflow into the Tasman Sea, in northern New Zealand.

Port Waikato is a well-known surfing and whitebaiting destination and a popular holiday spot. Fish can be caught off the rocks and surf beach, and off the sand dunes that border the river mouth. Flounder and mullet are also plentiful using drag nets. Port Waikato is a location where sedimentary rock formations of 65–85 million years' antiquity are found, and a Jurassic-period dinosaur fossil was found there. Weathertop footage from the Lord of the Rings was filmed in limestone outcrops just south of the town.

The Port has a Wharf Store, established 1893, a take-away shop, café, campground, library, community hall, fire station, surf lifesaving club, yachting club and an active fishing club. A school camp was established near the town in the 1920s, which boasts a well-formed BMX track. Port Waikato also serves as a popular wedding destination.

History

Port Waikato was an important port during the New Zealand Wars of the 19th century. It was the first of the colonial settlements to be constructed after the wars, being started in 1863. It had until then been called Putataka, but soon the present name was in general use. The Māori name remains for the  hill above the town.

For many years Port Waikato was the transhipment point between ships of the Northern Steamship Co and the river steamers of the Waikato Shipping Co, run by Caesar Roose. The frequency increased to twice a week in 1924. At the same time a Cambridge to Port Waikato excursion was being run two or three times a year, taking 12 to 14 hours downstream and a few hours longer upstream. Now the only public transport is a morning and afternoon bus from Pukekohe on Thursdays.

Demographics
Port Waikato is part of the larger Port Waikato-Waikaretu statistical area.

Port Waikato had a population of 528 at the 2018 New Zealand census, an increase of 57 people (12.1%) since the 2013 census, and an increase of 42 people (8.6%) since the 2006 census. There were 219 households, comprising 261 males and 261 females, giving a sex ratio of 1.0 males per female, with 84 people (15.9%) aged under 15 years, 90 (17.0%) aged 15 to 29, 255 (48.3%) aged 30 to 64, and 96 (18.2%) aged 65 or older.

Ethnicities were 74.4% European/Pākehā, 35.2% Māori, 4.5% Pacific peoples, 1.7% Asian, and 3.4% other ethnicities. People may identify with more than one ethnicity.

Although some people chose not to answer the census's question about religious affiliation, 58.5% had no religion, 26.1% were Christian, 2.8% had Māori religious beliefs and 2.3% had other religions.

Of those at least 15 years old, 66 (14.9%) people had a bachelor's or higher degree, and 123 (27.7%) people had no formal qualifications. 48 people (10.8%) earned over $70,000 compared to 17.2% nationally. The employment status of those at least 15 was that 204 (45.9%) people were employed full-time, 57 (12.8%) were part-time, and 24 (5.4%) were unemployed.

Port Waikato-Waikaretu statistical area

Port Waikato-Waikaretu had a population of 783 at the 2018 New Zealand census, an increase of 51 people (7.0%) since the 2013 census, and an increase of 54 people (7.4%) since the 2006 census. There were 330 households, comprising 384 males and 396 females, giving a sex ratio of 0.97 males per female. The median age was 46.3 years (compared with 37.4 years nationally), with 144 people (18.4%) aged under 15 years, 120 (15.3%) aged 15 to 29, 384 (49.0%) aged 30 to 64, and 132 (16.9%) aged 65 or older.

Ethnicities were 69.3% European/Pākehā, 39.8% Māori, 3.8% Pacific peoples, 1.9% Asian, and 2.3% other ethnicities. People may identify with more than one ethnicity.

The percentage of people born overseas was 9.2, compared with 27.1% nationally.

Although some people chose not to answer the census's question about religious affiliation, 58.6% had no religion, 29.1% were Christian, 1.9% had Māori religious beliefs and 1.9% had other religions.

Of those at least 15 years old, 87 (13.6%) people had a bachelor's or higher degree, and 186 (29.1%) people had no formal qualifications. The median income was $27,800, compared with $31,800 nationally. 72 people (11.3%) earned over $70,000 compared to 17.2% nationally. The employment status of those at least 15 was that 309 (48.4%) people were employed full-time, 78 (12.2%) were part-time, and 27 (4.2%) were unemployed.

Marae

The local Ōraeroa Marae and its Whareroa meeting house is meeting place for the Waikato Tainui hapū of Ngāti Tāhinga and Ngāti Tiipa.

Education

See also

Port Waikato electorate

References

Populated places in Waikato
Waikato District
Populated places on the Waikato River